Alligata Software Ltd. was a computer games developer and publisher based in Sheffield in the UK in the 1980s.

The company was founded by brothers Mike and Tim Mahony and their father J.R. Mahony in 1983. They produced games for a number of home computers including the Commodore 64, BBC Micro, Acorn Electron, ZX Spectrum and Dragon 32. The company published many of Tony Crowther's early Commodore 64 games, including Aztec Tomb, Blagger and Loco. Chris Butler was another programmer whose earlier games were released by Alligata. The company also published budget priced software under the Budgie label.

Tim Mahony took over the day-to-day running of the company in 1987 and closed the company nine months later. The name and back catalogue were sold to Superior Software. Two titles were released under the joint Superior/Alligata label for ports of Superior's BBC/Electron games to other systems. Superior also included some old Alligata games on their Play It Again Sam compilations.

Games 
 1983 Aztec Tomb (C64)
 1983 Here Comes The Sun (ZX Spectrum)
 1983 Bug Blaster (C64, BBC Micro, Acorn Electron)
 1983 Lunar Rescue (BBC Micro, Acorn Electron)
 1983 Blagger (C64, BBC Micro, Acorn Electron, MSX, Commodore 16) A version was also released through Amsoft for the Amstrad CPC
 1984 Loco (C64, ZX Spectrum, Atari 8-bit)
 1984 Son of Blagger (C64, ZX Spectrum, BBC Micro)
 1985 Who Dares Wins (C64)
 1985 Jack Charlton's Match Fishing (C64, ZX Spectrum)
 1985 Blagger Goes to Hollywood (C64)
 1986 Who Dares Wins II (C64, ZX Spectrum, BBC Micro, MSX, Amstrad CPC)
 1986 Night World (BBC Micro, Acorn Electron)
 1987 Kettle (C64, ZX Spectrum, Amstrad CPC)
 1987 Livingstone, I Presume? (C64, ZX Spectrum, MSX, Amstrad CPC) UK release of Spanish Opera Soft game Livingstone, Supongo
 1987 Addicta Ball (C64, MSX, Amiga, Atari ST)
 1988 By Fair Means or Foul (C64, ZX Spectrum, Amstrad CPC) A Superior/Alligata release
 1989 Repton Mania (ZX Spectrum) Ports of the first 2 Repton games - A Superior/Alligata release

Budgie label
Alligata published budget games under the Budgie label from 1985. When a typical Alligata game would cost around £6.95, Budgie games sold for only £1.99 in order to compete with the likes of budget software pioneer Mastertronic, already selling games at that level. Almost all titles were original rather than re-issues of Alligata games. Probably the most well known game is space shoot 'em up Video's Revenge (BBC Micro, Acorn Electron) with others including Convoy (ZX Spectrum), Super Sam (ZX Spectrum, Amstrad CPC), Raskel (C64) and Shuffle (BBC Micro, Acorn Electron).

References

External links
Alligata at World of Spectrum
Alligata at the BBC Games Archive
Budgie at World of Spectrum
Who Dares Wins game ending by Alligata Software

Defunct video game companies of the United Kingdom
Video game companies established in 1983
1983 establishments in England